The Yaringa Marine National Park is a protected marine national park located in Western Port, Victoria, Australia. The area comprises saltmarsh, mangroves, sheltered intertidal mudflats, subtidal soft sediments and tidal channels. It is part of the Western Port Ramsar site.

References

External links

Ramsar sites in Australia
Marine parks in Victoria (Australia)
Western Port
Coastline of Victoria (Australia)
Mornington Peninsula